Ostrovsky, Ostrovskoy, Ostrovskii ((Островский, masculine), Ostrovskaya, or Ostrovska (feminine) are variations of a Slavic surname. Notable people with the surname include:

Alexander Ostrovsky (1823–1886), Russian dramatist
Alexey Ostrovsky (born 1976), Russian politician
Anton Ostrovsky (born 1982), Israeli actor and rap singer
Arkady Ostrovsky (1914–1967), Soviet composer
Baruch Ostrovsky (1890–1960), first mayor of Ra'anana, Israel
Erika Ostrovsky (born 1926), Austrian-American biographer of Louis-Ferdinand Céline
Grigory Ostrovsky (1756–1814), Russian portrait painter
Iossif Ostrovskii (1934–2020), Ukrainian mathematician
Josh Ostrovsky (born 1982), American entrepreneur, social media personality
Leonid Ostrovsky (1936-2001), Soviet football star
Leonard Ostrovsky (1922–1973), US politician in Ohio
Mikhail Ostrovsky, several people:
Mikhail Nikolayevich Ostrovsky (1827–1901), Russian statesman
, commissar and Soviet minister to Bucharest, victim of Stalin's purges
Nikolai Ostrovsky (1904–1936), Russian Soviet writer, author of the novel How the Steel Was Tempered
Rafail Ostrovsky (born 1963), professor of computer science and mathematics at UCLA
Sasha Ostrovsky, member of Russian country music band Bering Strait
Simon Ostrovsky (born 1981), Soviet-born Jewish American journalist, director, and producer of documentaries 
Sofiya Ostrovska (born 1958), Ukrainian mathematician
Victor Ostrovsky (born 1949), Canadian-born, Israel-raised self-proclaimed former Mossad officer and author of several books
Vivian Ostrovsky (born 1945), experimental filmmaker

Fictional characters
 Elka Ostrovksy, character in Hot in Cleveland, a US TV sitcom
 Olive Ostrovsky, character in the musical, The 25th Annual Putnam County Spelling Bee

See also
 Andrey Astrowski (born 1973), also spelt  Andrei Ostrovskiy, former Belarusian footballer
 Ostrovsky (disambiguation)
 Ostrowski (disambiguation), Polish spelling

Russian-language surnames